Norah Al Shibani known as Reem Abdullah (born February 20, 1987) is a Saudi Arabian actress. She worked with comedians Nasser Al Qasabi and Abdullah Al-Sadhan in the 2007 television series Tash Ma Tash. In 2012, she was cast by the Saudi director Haifa Al-Mansour in the film Wadjda, which received critical acclaim.

Television and film work

TV series 
 Tash ma tash (2007–2009)
 Beni w beni (2008–2009)
 klna ayal quraya’’ (2008)
 Haitan w zaeab (2010)
 Homrai El-sahar 4 (2012)
 Alasouf (2018–2019)
 indma yktml alqamar pt1 (2019)
 indma yktml alqamar pt2 (2021)

 Movies 
 Wadjda'' (2012)

References

External links 
 
 elcinema

1987 births
Living people
People from Riyadh
Saudi Arabian film actresses
Saudi Arabian television actresses